Beijiang may refer to:

 Bei River (北江), a tributary of the Pearl River in southern China.
 Beijiang (北疆), a term for north part of Xinjiang Uyghur Autonomous Region of China. See Dzungaria.